Market Tower is a high-rise office building located at the northeast corner of Illinois and Market streets in Indianapolis, Indiana, United States. At the time of its completion in 1988, Market Tower was the largest privately financed speculative office project developed in the city. It is the fourth-tallest building in Indianapolis and the fifth-tallest building in Indiana. Market Tower is the second-tallest reinforced concrete building in the state, after the Indiana Michigan Power Center in Fort Wayne, Indiana.

History
Market Tower was topped-out on April 9, 1988. At the time of the building's dedication on October 18, 1988, it was 60% pre-leased.

In 1991, the Indiana Department of Natural Resources installed a nest box atop Market Tower as part of a statewide species reintroduction program for peregrine falcons. The nest box is located on the southeast corner of the tower's 31st floor. Since the first pair took roost in 1995, peregrine falcons have continuously occupied the site as recently as 2021.

In May 2014, the building's owner, HDG Mansur, was ordered to sell the property after defaulting on loans worth US$60 million. Zeller Realty Group purchased Market Tower for US$52.7 million in October 2014. Over the ensuing years, Zeller completed US$7 million in renovations then sold the building to Square Deal Capital in 2017.

According to the Indianapolis Business Journal, building amenities include a cafe, a conference center, a fitness center, and a restaurant. In 2022, the tower was 85% occupied, with tenants including multinational law firm Dentons and the United States Attorney's office for the United States District Court for the Southern District of Indiana.

Design
The building's façade appears much like a grid, clad in red and gray granite and metal mullions framing tinted windows. A series of setbacks gives way to a buttressed, copper roof topped with eight spires. Beginning on the second floor of its eastern façade, the tower's floorplate cantilevers over an alleyway. The building contains a three-level underground parking garage and a three-story atrium fronting W. Market St.

Market Tower's postmodern design borrows architectural elements found in neighboring landmarks. Cornelius Alig, president of Mansur Development Corporation in 1988, noted that the company "made it our priority" that the tower's design complement existing architecture near Monument Circle.

Steve Mannheimer, architecture critic writing for The Indianapolis Star, remarked on the influences:

See also
List of tallest buildings in Indianapolis
List of tallest buildings in Indiana

Notes

References

External links

Market Tower at CTBUH Skyscraper Center
Market Tower at SkyscraperPage
Market Tower at Emporis

Skyscraper office buildings in Indianapolis

Postmodern architecture in the United States
Office buildings completed in 1988
1988 establishments in Indiana